Warbat, an Arabic sweet pastry similar to baklava, consisting of layers of really thin phyllo dough filled with custard, though it is sometimes also filled with pistachios, walnuts, almonds, or sweet cheese. The dessert is topped with a sweet syrup made from sugar, water, and a hint of lemon brought to a boil and then left to cool and thicken.

When served with cream it is called warbat bi-qishteh or warbat be gishta. The treat is particularly associated with the religious holiday Ramadan. It's also popular in Syria, where it's also known by the name of Shaabiyat.

See also
Şöbiyet
Knafeh

References

Syrian cuisine
Arab pastries
Jordanian cuisine
Palestinian cuisine